Hugh Styles (born 25 June 1974) is a British sailor. Between 1985 and 1991, Styles was educated at Dover Grammar School for Boys. He competed in the Tornado event at the 2000 Summer Olympics.

References

External links
 

1974 births
Living people
British male sailors (sport)
Olympic sailors of Great Britain
Sailors at the 2000 Summer Olympics – Tornado
Sportspeople from Dover, Kent
People educated at Dover Grammar School for Boys
People from Dover, Kent